Empire College School of Law, part of Empire College and founded in 1973, is a four-year evening law school program accredited by the Committee of Bar Examiners of the State Bar of California. As an evening-only law school, the School of Law is not accredited by the American Bar Association. As a result, graduates are generally only eligible to take the bar and practice law in California.  Empire Law School's professors are practicing attorneys and judges from the North Bay area who teach in their specialty areas.

Empire graduates comprise approximately 25 percent of the Sonoma County Bar and include members of the judiciary in Sonoma, Napa, Mendocino, Merced, Lassen, Lake, and Calaveras counties.

Following a year of construction, the college opened its new campus in January 2000 which includes, as tenants, two California superior courts for the County of Sonoma at which civil cases are conducted. Moot Court and Trial Practice classes are held in the courtrooms. In the 2000 Roger J. Traynor California Appellate Moot Court Competition, the Empire College Moot Court Team won first place in both The California Academy of Appellate Lawyers Award for Best Brief and The Bernard E. Witkin Award for Excellence In Appellate Advocacy. In 2018, Empire's team won first place in oral argument at the competition, with both of their team members ranked among the top oralists.

In July, 2022, Empire reached an agreement, approved by the State Bar of California Committee of Bar Examiners to become a branch of the Monterey College of Law, pursuant to which it would transition from a for-profit, accredited law school, to a non-profit, accredited branch of Monterey, while retaining the Empire name.

References

External links

 

Educational institutions established in 1973
Law schools in California
Schools in Santa Rosa, California
Universities and colleges in Sonoma County, California
1973 establishments in California
Law in the San Francisco Bay Area
For-profit universities and colleges in the United States